The Penguin is a supervillain appearing in American comic books published by DC Comics, commonly as an adversary of the superhero Batman. The character made his first appearance in Detective Comics #58 (December 1941) and was created by Bob Kane and Bill Finger. The Penguin is one of Batman's most enduring enemies and belongs to the collective of adversaries that make up Batman's rogues gallery.

The Penguin is a Gotham City mobster who fancies himself the number one "Gentleman of Crime". He is most often seen wearing a monocle, top hat, and morning suit while carrying his signature umbrella. The character appears most times as a short, fat man with a long nose. Penguin uses high-tech umbrellas as different tools. His umbrellas have been used as guns, gas, swords/knives, a mini-helicopter and many other unconventional tools.  The Penguin owns and runs a nightclub called the Iceberg Lounge which provides a cover for his criminal activity. Batman sometimes uses the nightclub as a source of criminal underworld information. Unlike most of Batman's rogues gallery, the Penguin is completely sane and in full control of his actions, giving him a unique relationship with Batman. According to his creator Bob Kane, the character was inspired by the advertising mascot of Kool cigarettes in the 1940s; a penguin with a top hat and cane. Co-creator Bill Finger thought that the image of high-society gentlemen in tuxedos was reminiscent of emperor penguins. His main color is usually purple.

The Penguin has repeatedly been named one of the best Batman villains and one of the greatest villains in comics. Penguin was ranked #51 in IGN's list of the Top 100 Comic Book Villains of All Time. The character has been featured in various media adaptations, including feature films, television series, and video games. For example, the Penguin has been voiced by Paul Williams and David Ogden Stiers in the DC Animated Universe, Tom Kenny in The Batman, Nolan North in the Batman: Arkham video game series and Elias Toufexis in Gotham Knights. His live-action portrayals include Burgess Meredith in the 1960s Batman television series and its spin-off film, Danny DeVito in Batman Returns, Robin Lord Taylor in the television series Gotham, and Colin Farrell in the film The Batman, as well as the character's upcoming eponymous television series.

Publication history

The Penguin made his first appearance in Detective Comics #58 (December 1941) and was created by Bob Kane and Bill Finger.

Fictional character biography

Pre-Crisis

Golden Age

Originally known only by his alias, the Penguin first appeared in Gotham City as a skilled thief, sneaking a pair of priceless paintings (valued at $250,000 in 1941 dollars) out of an art museum by hiding the rolled-up canvases in the handle of his umbrella. The Penguin later used the stolen paintings as proof of his underworld acumen to a local mob boss, who allowed him to join his crime family. With the Penguin's planning, the mob pulled off a string of ingenious heists. The "be-monocled bird" and the mobster eventually fell out, leading Cobblepot to kill him with his umbrella gun. The Penguin became the leader of the mob and attempted to neutralize Batman by framing him for the theft of a statue which Penguin, himself, had stolen. As part of the plot, Penguin actually already owned the statue and was framing Batman and Robin to commit insurance fraud. The Penguin's plans were eventually prevented, but the bandit himself escaped.

Penguin was later sighted at the time when Dick Grayson was traveling on a train. Batman and Robin found out that he was getting reward money for turning in criminals that he later sprung from prison. While Batman and Robin defeated the criminals during the conflict, Penguin fell into the Mississippi River.<ref>Detective Comics #59. DC Comics.</ref>

Penguin made his way to Florida where he set up a gambling operation with Joe Crow, Buzzard Benny, and Canary where the patrons would win big and then they would be followed by Penguin's henchmen so that they can rob them. Batman and Robin put an end to the gambling operation, but Penguin got away.

Penguin later utilized some exotic birds to assist in his crime spree. Batman and Robin stopped this crime spree, but Penguin got away again.

Penguin later set himself up as an underworld advisor where he sold his foolproof plans to different criminals. When the criminals pulled off a successful heist, Penguin would kill them and steal their loot. To get to the bottom of this caper, Batman posed as a rival criminal called "Bad News Brewster". While Penguin figured out that Batman was posing as a criminal, Batman and Robin finally apprehended Penguin and brought him to justice.

Penguin soon became less violent and began to obsess over birds and umbrellas. After breaking out of prison, Penguin hears that Batman doesn't consider him a threatening villain. To prove Batman wrong, Penguin built himself some gimmick guns and fishing poles. Batman was able to defeat him with an umbrella.

Penguin later escaped from prison and tried to rob three eccentric millionaires. While Batman and Robin failed to catch him after the first two robberies, they catch him during the third one due to the fact that the third millionaire has been dead for a year.

Penguin later escaped from prison. To catch him, Batman and Robin set up an umbrella repair shop. Despite some difficulties, Batman and Robin were finally able to catch Penguin when he tripped over an umbrella.

Penguin later met Joker in prison. When both of them broke out of prison, Penguin and Joker competed against each other in robberies until one where they managed to work together to pull it off. Their differences would be the advantage that Batman and Robin would use to apprehend them.

Penguin took the son of a criminal under his wing and started to teach him about crime. The uninterested boy wrote a book about Penguin's crimes. This impressed Penguin to the point where he plotted to get it published. When that failed, he started to steal some publishing supplies which led to the boy attracting the attention of Batman and Robin. After Batman and Robin apprehended Penguin, the book is shown to the readers that "crime doesn't pay".

Penguin later attempted to extort money from a shipping company by pretending to flash-freeze a member of its board of directors and would thaw them out once his demands are met. When Batman and Robin found that the frozen victims were all dummies, they raided Penguin's hideout and apprehended him.

Penguin later went on another crime spree and was stopped by Batman and Robin.

Three crooks tricked Penguin into distracting Batman and Robin so that they can commit crimes. While the crooks were defeated by Batman, Penguin suffered a humiliating defeat at the hands of Robin.

Upon his release from prison, Penguin opened a restaurant called the Penguin's Nest as part of a plot to get arrested so that he can collaborate with an incarcerated forger. Batman foiled this plot that involved getting Penguin arrested for fraud.

When a fire broke out in prison, Penguin saved the prison warden. He was released on parole and tried to go straight only for him to see a cartoon that depicted that mocked penguins. Penguin went on a crime spree that revolved around that cartoon and was apprehended by Batman and Robin.

After breaking out of prison, Penguin posed as an assistant to a reclusive ornithologist named Professor Boyd where he used his ornithology stage as a front for his bird-themed crime spree. Batman and Robin defeated Penguin and brought him to justice.

Penguin was released from prison and set up his own bird shop where he sold his birds to the prominent people of Gotham City. The birdcages had bombs that would enable Penguin to break into their houses and rob them. Batman and Robin deduced Penguin's plot and apprehended him.

Penguin's next plot involved extorting the singers of Gotham City by using special microphones that released a type of gas that affected the singers' singing abilities if they don't pay him. Batman and Robin deduce the scheme and apprehend Penguin.

Penguin started another crime spree in order to dominate the crime sprees that were being committed by Joker and Catwoman. Even though his crime spree involved rare birds, Penguin was apprehended by Batman once again.

Penguin had to improvise his next crime spree when a thunderbolt destroyed his hideout and trick umbrellas. While committing a crime spree using umbrella-shaped objects, Penguin was apprehended by Batman and Robin.

Penguin began to use codes in order to get information on how to break out of prison. Upon getting hold of Penguin's code book, Batman figured out Penguin's plot and apprehended him.

Penguin broke out of prison and vowed not to use birds in his crime spree. One of those crime sprees caused Penguin to be tripped by birds. When some chicks swallowed some diamonds, he attempts to make off with them only to be apprehended by Batman and Robin.

Upon being released from prison, Penguin started a sideshow attraction called Pee-Wee the Talking Penguin. This was a cover for a scheme to use the penguin costume to commit robberies to obtain the money to pay off his previously hired goons. Batman and Robin apprehend Penguin who was arrested for committing fraud a second time.

Penguin got out of jail for snitching on the criminal Squeeze Miller which led to Miller's execution. He was surprised that Miller listed him in his will. To get the inheritance, Penguin had to commit a specific robbery using specific birds. Batman deduced Penguin's criminal activity and apprehended him when it turned out that Miller's inheritance was worthless.

Penguin was paroled from prison where he tries to get the Bird Lovers' Society to elect the penguin the state bird. When that was turned down, Penguin began his revenge on the Bird Lovers' Society by robbing them until he was thwarted by Batman and Robin.

Using the prison's workshop, Penguin made some mechanical wings that enabled him to escape from prison. He and his henchmen then committed a series of crimes using the mechanical wings which involved abducting Robin so that they can get Batman to reveal his true identity. Batman rescued Robin and defeated Penguin and his henchmen.

After escaping from prison again, Penguin had a hard time finding henchmen due to the many times he was apprehended by Batman. Upon becoming inspired by a newspaper article, Penguin committed a series of crimes involving a white feather until he was apprehended by Batman and Robin.

Penguin feigned going straight again and purchased a mansion which he converted into a museum and bird sanctuary where he started returning stolen loot to the robbery victims. Batman and Robin figure out that Penguin has planted gas bombs in a plot to re-steal the loot and were able to apprehend him.

On Penguin's birthday, Penguin received presents from the other criminals where the presents mocked him. Penguin began another bird-related scheme before being apprehended by Batman and Robin.

Penguin is paroled from prison again and was asked to release his birds as a sign of good will. Penguin proceeds to open up his umbrella company called Penguin Umbrellas Inc. where he even fooled Batman into endorsing his products. This was a cover-up for his plan to rob Gotham City with the special magnets that are in the umbrellas. Following the robbery, Penguin fled to Oasis Beach Island in the Caribbean Sea where he attempted another umbrella-themed theft before being apprehended by Batman and Robin.

In his final Golden Age appearance, Penguin began a scheme that involved him pretending to be a legitimate businessman where he used clever frauds of mythological birds that he passed off as the real thing. Then Penguin started to claim that Batman was associated with a Man-Bat of his own design. Batman foiled Penguin's plot and apprehended him.

Silver Age
Born Oswald Chesterfield Cobblepot, the Penguin was bullied as a child for his short stature, weight, way of walking, and beak-like nose. Several stories relate that he was forced, as a child, to always carry an umbrella by his overprotective mother due to his father dying of bronchial pneumonia from refusing to take one while going out in the rain. His parents owned a bird shop, where Cobblepot spent most of his time with the birds, seeing them as his only friends, and lavishing them with attention. His love of birds would eventually lead him to study ornithology in college – only to find out that he knew more about birds than most of his professors did. In some versions, Cobblepot turns to crime after his mother dies and the bird shop, along with all of her birds, is repossessed to pay her debts.

Penguin's first fight with Batman and Robin occurred when he was behind a series of thefts and left behind eggs as clues. Batman and Robin tracked Penguin down and his egg clue proved to be his undoing when he got bitten by a baby alligator that hatched from one of the eggs.

The injury Penguin got from the alligator caused him to briefly retire from crime. After being mocked by other criminals, Penguin began to plague Batman again by committing bird-related crimes. He was foiled by Batman and Robin.

Penguin tricked Batman into planning his next robbery by planting bugged umbrellas around Gotham City. He was foiled by Batman and Robin.

Andrew Helm used his Corti-Conscious Machine to manipulate Penguin, Captain Cold, Mirror Master, and Shark into battling the Justice League.

Penguin collaborated with Joker and Riddler into turning Batman into some type of Bat-Hulk using an experimental gas. Metamorpho helped to restore Batman to normal and they apprehended all three criminals.

At the time when Penguin was robbing a bird sanctuary in Metropolis, he nearly gets killed due to Catwoman's plot that involved her hypnotizing Lois Lane into attacking him only for it to be averted thanks to Superman's intervention.

Penguin gathered his gang and armed them with weapons from the future to combat modern crime-fighting technology. While most of these plots were foiled by Batman and Robin, Penguin was knocked out by Alfred Pennyworth.

While in prison, Penguin and Joker heard the news that Batman is retiring. This turned out to be a ruse.

At the time when Batman was shaking off the effects from Scarecrow's fear pills, Penguin escapes from prison and ends up apprehended by Batman and Robin.

Doctor Destiny manipulates Penguin, Doctor Light, Lex Luthor, Tattooed Man, Cutlass Charlie, Captain Boomerang, Floronic Man, and I.Q. into switching bodies with the Justice League. Penguin switched bodies with Batman. The Justice League managed to thwart this plot and apprehend the villains.

Penguin Joker, Catwoman, the Imposter Mad Hatter, Cluemaster, Getaway Genius, and Johnny Witts get concerned about the western mob encroaching in their territory. Coming together as the Gangland Guardians, they competed with the western mob in taking out Batman first.

After laying low for a short time, Penguin began his next plot that involved kidnapping a young ruler named King Peeble IV of Swawak in order to take over Swawak. Batman and Robin defeated him with help from Talia al Ghul.

At the time when King Kull plotted to cause havoc on Earth-One, Earth-Two, and Earth-S, he enlists Penguin, Queen Clea of Earth-Two, Blockbuster of Earth-One, and Ibac of Earth-S for his attack on Earth-Two, where he tries to wreck Atlantis and use a cloud to sink islands. They are thwarted by Superman of Earth-One, Wonder Woman of Earth-Two, Green Arrow of Earth-One, and Spy Smasher of Earth-S.

Penguin then did a heist on treasures belonging to short rulers using robot versions of extinct birds to keep Batman busy. Batman managed to apprehend Penguin. Penguin did another little man-motive crime and was apprehended by Batman again.

Penguin later participated in Hugo Strange's auction of Batman's secret identity.

At the time when the Gotham City council outlawed Batman and Robin, both of them had to work outside the law to apprehend Penguin during his diamond heist.

Penguin collaborated with Terra-Man in a plot to hypnotize Superman into thinking he's the Sundance Kid and have him attack Batman. Once Batman snapped Superman out of this hypnosis, they proceeded to apprehend Penguin and Terra-Man.

At the time when Penguin was planning to rob a Pterodactylus egg from the museum, he was easily thwarted by Robin.

When four criminals plotted to testify against Penguin, he began a plot to kill them before they can do that. This plot was foiled by Batman and Black Canary.

Using a trained falcon, Penguin captured a millionaire. It took the combined efforts of Batman, Robin, and Green Arrow to rescue the millionaire and defeat Penguin.

Penguin later did a plot that involved having a fake Joker murder him. This was thwarted by Batman and the real Joker.

Joker recruited Penguin, Riddler, Two-Face, Mr. Freeze, Mad Hatter, Scarecrow, Clayface II, Black Spider, Cavalier, Signalman, and Spook in a plot to take out Killer Croc. The villains were defeated by Batman, Robin, Batgirl, Catwoman, and Talia al Ghul.

Penguin stole an early warning system that the Pentagon developed. He planned to sell it to some Russian spies. Batman tracked Penguin down to Antarctica and defeated him. Though he did learn that Penguin was planning on double-crossing the Russian spies.

During the "Crisis on Infinite Earths" storyline, Penguin is among the superheroes and supervillains that were gathered by Lex Luthor of Earth-Three and Harbinger to deal with the destruction of the Multiverse at the hands of the Anti-Monitor. After the Anti-Monitor was seemingly destroyed, Penguin was among the villains recruited by Lex Luthor to join a coalition of supervillains that plan to take control of the remaining universes. He was dispatched to Earth-S and fought with the superheroes sent to liberate Earth-S.

The Penguin made his last Silver Age appearance during the last appearance of the Earth-One Batman. After he and a multitude of Batman's enemies are broken out of Arkham Asylum and Gotham State Penitentiary by Ra's al Ghul, the Penguin carries out Ra's' plans to kidnap Batman's friends and allies. Penguin, Joker, Mad Hatter, Cavalier, Deadshot, and Killer Moth lay siege to Gotham City Police Headquarters, but are infuriated when Joker sabotages their attempt at holding Commissioner James Gordon for ransom. A standoff ensues, with Joker on one side and Penguin and Mad Hatter on the other. The Joker quickly subdues both with a burst of laughing gas from one of his many gadgets.

Post-Crisis
Following the rebooting the history of the DC Universe, the Penguin was relegated to sporadic appearances, until writer Alan Grant (who had earlier penned the Penguin origin story "The Killing Peck" in Secret Origins Special #1) and artist Norm Breyfogle brought him back, deadlier than ever.

In this continuity, Oswald Cobblepot is an outcast in his high-society family and their rejection drives him to become a criminal. In keeping with his aristocratic origins, the Penguin pursues his criminal career while wearing formal attire such as a top hat, monocle, and tuxedo, especially of the "white-tie-and-tails" design. He is one of the relatively few villains in Batman's rogues gallery who is sane and in full control of his actions, although still ruthless and capable of extreme violence. He is also highly intelligent and can even match wits with Batman, in some cases using his access to information and business connections to assist the vigilante. Batman once admitted the Penguin is smarter than he is.

During their run, the Penguin forms a brief partnership with hypnotist Mortimer Kadaver, who helps him fake his own death as a ploy to strike an unsuspecting Gotham, only for Kadaver to include a post-hypnotic suggestion that will leave Penguin back in his comatose state and only able to be awoken by a command that Kadaver alone knows. The Penguin later kills Kadaver, after plugging his own ears with toilet paper so that the hypnotist no longer has power over him. After Batman foils this particular endeavor, the Penguin embarks on one of his grandest schemes ever in the three-part story "The Penguin Affair". Finding Harold Allnut being tormented by two gang members, the Penguin takes in the technologically gifted hunchback, showing him kindness in exchange for services. Harold builds a gadget that allows the Penguin to control flocks of birds from miles away, which the Penguin utilizes to destroy radio communications in Gotham and crash a passenger plane. This endeavor, too, is foiled by Batman, who hires Harold as his mechanic.

The Penguin resurfaces during Jean Paul Valley's tenure as Batman and is one of the few people to deduce that Valley is not the original Caped Crusader. To confirm his theory, he kidnaps Sarah Essen Gordon, places her in a death trap set to go off at midnight, and turns himself in, utilizing the opportunity to mock her husband Commissioner Gordon as midnight approaches. An increasingly infuriated Gordon is nearly driven to throw him off the police headquarters roof before Valley rescues Sarah moments before midnight. As Valley leaves, he says, "There's nothing the Penguin can throw at me that I haven't encountered before." The Penguin reluctantly agrees with this sentiment, accepting that he has become passé. Subsequently, the Penguin turns his attentions to a new modus operandi, operating behind the front of a legitimate restaurant and casino he calls "The Iceberg Lounge", which Batman sometimes uses as a source of criminal underworld information. Though he is arrested for criminal activities several times during the course of his "reform", he always manages to secure a release from prison thanks to his high-priced lawyers.

In the storyline "No Man's Land", Gotham City is nearly leveled by an earthquake. The Penguin stays behind when the U.S. government blockades the city. He becomes one of the major players in the lawless city, using his connections to profit by trading the money that nobody else in Gotham could use for goods through his contacts outside the city. One of these connections is discovered to be Lex Luthor and his company LexCorp. The Penguin's information helps Luthor to gain control of Gotham's property records, but Luthor dismisses him when the Penguin attempts to blackmail Luthor.

The Penguin has swept up in the events of Infinite Crisis. In the seventh issue, he is briefly seen as part of the Battle of Metropolis, a multi-character brawl started by Alexander Luthor Jr.'s Secret Society of Super Villains which he is a member of. The Penguin, along with several other villains, is bowled over at the surprise appearance of Bart Allen.

One Year Later while the Penguin is away from Gotham City, the Great White Shark and the Tally Man kill many of the villains who had worked for him, and frame the reformed Harvey Dent. The Great White Shark had planned to take over Gotham's criminal syndicate and eliminate the competition, the Penguin included. Upon his return to Gotham, the Penguin continues to claim that he has gone straight, and reopens the Iceberg, selling overpriced Penguin merchandise. He urges the Riddler to avoid crime, as their new shady but legal lifestyle is more lucrative.

The Penguin was featured as a prominent figure in the Gotham Underground tie-in to the series Countdown. He fights a gang war against Tobias Whale, Intergang and the New Rogues, while supposedly running an "underground railroad" for criminals. In the end, Batman convinces the Penguin to become his informant.

The Penguin later loses Batman's support after the latter's mysterious disappearance and Intergang's exploitation of the return of the Apokoliptan Gods. He appears in Battle for the Cowl: The Underground, which depicts the effects of Batman's disappearance on his enemies. The Penguin's mob is absorbed by Black Mask II, who controls his criminal activities. The Penguin, with the aid of the Mad Hatter, abducts Batman and brainwashes him to assassinate Black Mask.

During the events of Brightest Day, the Birds of Prey discover the Penguin beaten and stabbed at the feet of the White Canary. The Birds rescue him and flee to the Iceberg. While recovering, the Penguin expresses his attraction to the Dove. Eventually, the Penguin reveals that his injury had been a ruse and that he is working with the White Canary in exchange for valuable computer files on the superhero community. He betrays the Birds and seriously injures both Lady Blackhawk and the Hawk before the Huntress defeats him. The Huntress tapes him up with the intention of taking him with her, only to be informed by Oracle that she has to let him go due to a police manhunt for the Birds. The Huntress considers killing him with her crossbow, but ultimately leaves him bound and gagged in an alley with the promise that she would exact her vengeance on him later.

The Penguin is eventually attacked by the Secret Six, who kill many of his guards in an ambush at his mansion. Bane informs him that he needs information on Batman's partners, as he plans on killing Red Robin, Batgirl, Catwoman, and Azrael. The Penguin soon betrays the team's location, which results in the Justice League, the Teen Titans, the Birds of Prey, the Justice Society, and various other heroes hunting down and capturing the criminals. Around this time, a new supervillain, who calls himself the Architect, plants a bomb in the Iceberg Lounge as revenge for crimes committed by the Penguin's ancestor. Though Blackbat and Robin are able to evacuate the building, the Lounge is destroyed in the ensuing explosion.

The New 52
In 2011, The New 52 rebooted the DC universe. The Penguin is a client of a criminal named Raju who was sent to offer gold to the Dollmaker for Batman's release. While in his Iceberg Casino, the Penguin views a disguised Charlotte Rivers on his surveillance cameras and tells his henchwoman Lark to make sure Rivers gets "a story to die for". During the Death of the Family crossover, the Penguin puts his right-hand man Ignatius Ogilvy in charge of his operations in his temporary absence. Ogilvy, however, uses the Penguin's absence to declare him dead, taking over his gang and killing those loyal to him. Under the alias "Emperor Penguin", Ogilvy takes over the Penguin's operations. Upon the Joker's defeat, Batman unsuccessfully attempts to imprison the Penguin in Blackgate Penitentiary, only to be forced to release him later. Upon learning of Ogilvy's betrayal, the Penguin attacks his former henchman's new empire, but Batman intervenes and arrests him. The Penguin is found not guilty, however, thanks to the machinations of his ally Mr. Combustible threatening the judge's family. Meanwhile, Ogilvy releases Kirk Langstrom's Man-Bat serum on Gotham City, turning many of the citizens into Man-Bats. Langstrom discovers a cure, returning the citizens to normal. Ogilvy then takes the serum himself which was spiced with the Venom drug and one of Poison Ivy's plant concoctions. Emperor Penguin then challenges Batman openly to a fight, defeating the masked vigilante with his newfound prowess and leaving him to be rescued by the Penguin. The pair forge a temporary alliance and defeat Ogilvy.

The Penguin also played a role in the Black Canary's rebooted origin. In Birds of Prey (vol. 4) #0, Dinah sought to land a job at the Iceberg Lounge, knowing that a lead on the Basilisk organization which she was pursuing would soon spring up there. Unfortunately, the Penguin was not in the habit of taking job applications, so she decided to prove her worth by infiltrating the outfit by herself. When she arrived in the Penguin's bathroom, he was unimpressed. To prove her worth, she demonstrated her special ability: a sonic scream that could shake down the roof, if it were intense enough. Naturally, the scream alerted the Penguin's henchmen, and she made short work of them with her martial arts skills. Finally impressed, the Penguin hired her, and dubbed her the Black Canary in keeping with the ornithological theme.

During the "Forever Evil" storyline, the Penguin is among the villains recruited by the Crime Syndicate of America to join the Secret Society of Super Villains. With the heroes gone, the Penguin becomes the Mayor of Gotham City and divides the different territories among the inmates of Arkham Asylum. Bane retrieves Ignatius Ogilvy (now calling himself "Emperor Blackgate") for the Penguin as part of their agreement. When Bane brings him to the Penguin, he tells Emperor Blackgate that the Arkham fighters are not scared of Bane as he does not instill fear as Batman did.

DC Rebirth
In the "Watchmen" sequel Doomsday Clock, the Penguin is among the villains that attend the underground meeting held by the Riddler that talks about the Superman Theory. When the Penguin suggests that they hand Moonbow and Typhoon over to the government that supposedly created them, Typhoon attacks Penguin until the Comedian crashes the meeting.

Characterization
Skills and abilities
The Penguin is a master criminal who aspires to be wealthy, powerful and respected (or at least feared) by Gotham's high society. The Penguin's wealth gives him access to better resources than most other Batman villains, and he is able to mix with Gotham's elite, especially those he plans to target in his future crimes. He is also capable of returning to his luxurious lifestyle very easily despite his violent criminal history and prison record. He has even attempted multiple times to enter the political world, even launching expensive election campaigns. The Penguin also has strong connections with other criminal kingpins across Gotham, allowing him to hire their assassins and workers to spy on them easily. The Penguin relies on cunning, wit, and intimidation to exploit his surroundings for profit, and despite his short temper, he is normally depicted as being more rational and sane than other Batman villains, or at least relatively so.

Although he often delegates the dirty work to his henchmen, he is not above taking aggressive and lethal actions on his own, especially when provoked or insulted. In spite of his appearance and stature, he is a dangerous hand-to-hand combatant with enough developed skills in judo, fencing, ninjutsu and bare-knuckle boxing to overwhelm attackers many times his size and physical bearing. The Penguin is usually portrayed as a capable physical combatant when he feels the situation calls for it, but his level of skill varies widely depending on the author; the character has been written both as a physical match for Batman and as someone the masked vigilante is capable of defeating with a solid punch. His crimes often revolve around stealing valuable bird-related items and his car and other vehicles often have an avian theme.

Equipment
The Penguin utilizes an assortment of umbrellas, particularly the Bulgarian umbrella. These usually contain weapons such as machine guns, sword blades, knife blades, rocket launchers, laser blasters, flamethrowers, and acid or poison gas spraying devices fired from the ferrule (however, the Penguin is able to weaponize his umbrellas in an almost unlimited variety of ways). Depending on the writer, some of his umbrellas can carry multiple weapons at once. He often carries an umbrella that can transform its canopy into a series of spinning blades: this can be used as a miniature helicopter or as an offensive weapon; he often uses this to escape a threatening situation. The canopy of the umbrella is sometimes depicted as being a bullet resistant shield, and some are patterned in different ways from a spiral capable of hypnotizing opponents to flashy signs. He can also call upon his flying birds to attack and confuse his enemies in battle.

Appearance
The Penguin's usual appearance as that of a short, obese human in formal wear has alternatively changed with the debut of Tim Burton's version of the character featured in the 1992 film Batman Returns. In the film, the Penguin's hands are flippers (a physical deformity caused by syndactyly), which, combined with a beak-like nose and other characteristics, made the Penguin look like a cross between an actual penguin and a man. This somewhat bizarre aspect inspired comic book artists and has influenced numerous Penguin designs in cartoons since the film's release, such as Batman: The Animated Series, for example. Currently, both the old and the new appearances of the character alternate in the comics, although there is no clear explanation or basis in reality for this to happen.

Relationships
The idea of the Penguin and the Joker as a team is one that is decades old, as the two villains, pop-culture wise, are arguably Batman's two most famous enemies. Their first team-up took place fairly early in Batman's career, in "Knights of Knavery". Since then, the two have teamed up countless times throughout the Golden and Silver Ages. This carried over into the 1960s television series as well; both appeared together as a team numerous times. They have even shown affection towards each other on more than one occasion; in one story, "Only Devils Have Wings", the Joker actually cries when it appears that the Penguin has been murdered, and vows to avenge the Penguin's death.

Reception

The character of the Penguin, particularly as portrayed by Burgess Meredith, has often been used as a theme to mock public figures that supposedly resemble him. Jon Stewart, host of The Daily Show, has made numerous references comparing former Vice President Dick Cheney with the Penguin, including a laugh similar to the one heard in the 1960s Batman series. In May 2006, a Republican-led PR firm, DCI Group, created an astroturfing YouTube video satirizing Al Gore's film An Inconvenient Truth. The video portrayed Gore as the Penguin using one of his trick umbrellas to hypnotize a flock of penguins into believing in the existence of global warming and climate change. Roger Stone has also been likened to Penguin due to his manner of dress.

Other versions
Joker
The Penguin (mockingly referred to as "Abner" by the Joker) appeared in Joker, a graphic novel by Brian Azzarello and Lee Bermejo. This incarnation operates the Iceberg Lounge, handles most of Joker's personal investments and deals with revenues from boxing matches.

Elseworlds
In the Elseworlds story Batman: Crimson Mist, the third part in a trilogy that turned Batman into a vampire, the Penguin is the first of many criminals to be killed by the vampiric Batman after he surrenders to his darker instincts. As the book begins, the Penguin has just escaped from Arkham again, and has apparently developed a reputation as a cop-killer. As the Penguin lures a group of cops into a trap, he impales one in the head with his umbrella, but Batman arrives in the form of a monstrous bat before the Penguin's men can claim more victims. Batman brutally tears the Penguin's throat out as he drinks his blood and subsequently kills his enemy, proceeding to kill the rest of the Penguin's gang and tear off their heads to stop them from returning as vampires.

In Batman: The Doom That Came to Gotham, an Elseworlds setting based on the works of H. P. Lovecraft, Bruce Wayne is the leader of an expedition to Antarctica of which there is only one survivor. The rescue team finds no trace of him, but it is revealed to the reader that the now half-insane Cobblepot has abandoned his humanity, and joined the albino penguins of the Elder Things' city.

Superman/Batman
In Superman/Batman, an amalgamation of the Penguin and Metallo, called Penguello, appears among the mercenaries recruited into Lex Joker's Brotherhood of Injustice. Thanks to Terranado, who had gone undercover within the Justice Titans, they were able to attack the Justice Tower.

Flashpoint
In the alternative timeline of Flashpoint, Oswald Cobblepot works as the security chief of Wayne Casinos, providing information about his clients and the criminal underworld to that universe's Batman, Thomas Wayne.

Batman: Earth One
In the graphic novel series Batman: Earth One, Oswald Cobblepot is the corrupt mayor of Gotham City. Although he doesn't call himself the Penguin like his mainstream counterpart, he is occasionally referred to by the nickname. In the past, he was the mayoral competition for Dr. Thomas Wayne. Cobblepot holds a grudge against the Wayne family, believing the Waynes have disgraced the Cobblepot legacy, so he planned for the Waynes to be murdered, but was not ultimately responsible for their death; they are instead killed in a random mugging on election night. It is also implied that Cobblepot had James Gordon's wife murdered when the detective got too close to finding out Cobblepot's involvement with the Waynes' murder. In the present, Cobblepot runs Gotham with an iron fist, controlling all the power centers of the city and using a hired killer named Ray Salinger, also known as "The Birthday Boy". When Batman confronts Cobblepot, he sticks Batman with a trick stiletto from his umbrella then he removes Batman's cowl, finding out that Batman is Bruce Wayne. Fortunately, Alfred Pennyworth arrives on the scene and empties two barrels into Cobblepot's chest. The blast sent Cobblepot's body out of the window where he landed into the street below. After his death, his crimes were finally outed to the public.

The Further Adventures of Batman Volume 2 featuring the Penguin
In the short story "Vulture: A Tale of the Penguin", by Steve Rasnic, the Penguin loses weight to the point of emaciation and becomes a vigilante, calling himself the Vulture.

Batman/Teenage Mutant Ninja Turtles
In the Batman/Teenage Mutant Ninja Turtles crossover, the Penguin is first seen at the docks with the Shredder, selling him a WayneTech Resonance Engine, but the Shredder betrays him and reveals he has already taken care of most of his men and plans on taking the engine himself. The Shredder is then about to kill the Penguin, but the Penguin offers to provide him weapons and money for his plan in order to save himself. The Shredder decides to spare the Penguin, calling him "Bird Man." The Shredder then uses the Iceberg Lounge as his base, where the Penguin has engineers working on the resonance engine to power his machine. The Shredder then reveals that he plans on bringing an army through the dimensional portal and take over Gotham City. The Penguin objects, but the Shredder threatens to kill him and tells him that he belongs to the Foot Clan. As the Shredder gets ready to open the portal, Batman and the Ninja Turtles arrive to stop them, but the Shredder destroys the portal and escapes with Ra's al Ghul. During the battle, the Penguin escapes as well. The Penguin then visits Batman, the Ninja Turtles, and Commissioner Gordon and tells them about the Shredder's plans, betraying him. The Penguin, though, does not agree with the Shredder's plans and reveals that the Shredder and the Foot Clan are now working with Ra's al Ghul and the League of Assassins. Later, Robin and Casey Jones reveal that the League and the Foot are using Arkham Asylum as their base. When Batman and Robin arrive, they are greeted by the Penguin, who has been mutated into a mutant rockhopper penguin as punishment for betraying the Shredder, along with the Joker, Two-Face, Riddler, Harley Quinn, Mr. Freeze, Mad Hatter, Bane, Scarecrow, Poison Ivy, and the Ventriloquist, who have all been mutated into animals and attack Batman and Robin. Batman is captured, but Robin manages to escape. The Ninja Turtles and Splinter then arrive, where Splinter defeats the mutated villains, while Batman uses his new Intimidator Armor to defeat the Shredder and the Turtles defeat Ra's. Later, Gordon tells Batman that the police scientists have managed to turn all of the inmates at Arkham back to normal and are currently in A.R.G.U.S. custody.

Batman: White Knight
The Penguin has a minor appearance in the 2017 series Batman: White Knight. The Penguin, along with several other Batman villains, is tricked by Jack Napier (who in this reality was a Joker who had been force-fed an overdose of pills by Batman which temporarily cured him of his insanity) into drinking drinks that had been laced with particles from Clayface's body. This was done so that Napier, who was using Mad Hatter's technology to control Clayface, could also control the villains by way of Clayface's ability to control parts of his body that had been separated from him. The Penguin and the other villains are then used to attack a library which Napier himself was instrumental in building in one of Gotham City's poorer districts. Later on in the story, the control hat is stolen by the Neo-Joker (the second Harley Quinn, who felt that Jack Napier was a pathetic abnormality while the Joker was the true, beautiful personality), in an effort to get Napier into releasing the Joker persona. Penguin also appears in the sequel storyline Batman: Curse of the White Knight, being among the villains murdered by Azrael.

Earth -22
In The Batman Who Laughs, the Penguin of Earth -22 is depicted as having been killed by the Joker during his penultimate act of terror against the Batman.

Harley Quinn
In Harley Quinn Rebirth'', the Penguin had been running a superhero sex club in New York City for over a year. He has been engaged in serious plans to take over Coney Island to turn it into a private resort (based on himself, of course). Unfortunately for him, Harley Quinn had been beating him up and otherwise threatening his plans in that direction. So to get her out of the way, he made an agreement with Gotham's underworld. After the death of her friend Mason at the hands of New York's corrupt mayor, Professor Hugo Strange and False Face dosed her with truth serum to increase her depression and separate her from her friends. Then when she left, Penguin kept her and all of her friends busy with various Batman villains while he threatened the land owners to give over their property and used two kaiju penguins to kill off 90% of the crime lords in New York.

When Harley finally figured it out, she came back and gathered all of her friends, including Poison Ivy (who used a giant daffodil to fight the giant penguins in what was described at 'The worst kaiju battle ever!"), her Gang of Harleys, Power Girl, Killer Croc, and Scarface (who switched sides), Captain Strong, her Roller Derby team, her stalkers/friends Harley Sinn and Red Tool, and various other characters for a huge showdown with pretty much every Batman villain ranging from Batzarro to the Zebra-Man. Harley eventually made her way up to the Penguin while her friends eventually beat up his collected allies and, while beating him up, revealed she suspected it was all really about her turning down his perverted advances. In the end after the bad guys on Penguin's side were all rounded up, he was revealed to have extorted the land from everyone and the owners all got their places back so they could rebuild.

In other media

See also
 List of Batman family enemies
 Bulgarian umbrella, a real-world weapon similar to the Penguin's umbrella gun which was used by the KGB in several assassinations in the late 1970s
 Syndactyly, the physical deformity which gave some versions of the Penguin his flipper-like hands

References

External links

Penguin at DC Comics' official website

Action film villains
Villains in animated television series
Batman characters
Comics characters introduced in 1941
Characters created by Bob Kane
Characters created by Bill Finger
DC Comics film characters
DC Comics male supervillains
DC Comics martial artists
DC Comics orphans
DC Comics television characters
Fictional boxers
Fictional characters with dwarfism
Fictional crime bosses
Fictional double agents
Fictional gunfighters in comics
Fictional judoka
Fictional hunchbacks
Fictional karateka
Fictional kidnappers
Fictional gangsters
Fictional murderers
Fictional socialites
Golden Age supervillains
Male characters in film
Male film villains
Male characters in television
Video game bosses